Jutta Müller ( Lötzsch; born 13 December 1928) is a German former figure skater and one of the most successful figure skating coaches worldwide.

Personal life 
Jutta Lötzsch was born to Marie Lötzsch (née Prusky) and Emil Lötzsch, the 1930 Saxony champion in wrestling. Her first marriage was to Wolfgang Seyfert. They had a daughter, Gabriele Seyfert, before divorcing. Her second husband was Bringfried Müller (1931–2016), an East German soccer player.

Career 

In 1949, Müller won the East German Championships in women's pair skating with partner Irene Salzmann. This category was created because of the lack of men in Germany after World War II. In 1953, she won the ladies' singles bronze medal at the East German nationals.

After World War II, Müller became a teacher of German and sports. In 1946, she became a member of the SED, the former East German communist party. She studied at the Deutsche Hochschule für Körperkultur in Leipzig, and in 1955 she began coaching figure skating.

Müller's first student was her own daughter Gabriele Seyfert, who twice won the World Championships (1969 and 1970). She also coached, among men, Günter Zöller, Jan Hoffmann, Nils Köpp, Rico Krahnert and Ronny Winkler; and, among women, Sonja Morgenstern, Anett Pötzsch, Katarina Witt, Evelyn Großmann, Martina Clausner, Marion Weber, Constanze Gensel and Simone Lang. Altogether, her students won three Olympic gold medals and ten world championship titles. In comparison, Carlo Fassi's students won four Olympic gold medals and eight world championship titles.

In 2004, Müller was admitted into the World Figure Skating Hall of Fame.

References 

 Eiskunstlauftrainerin erinnert
 various German newspapers, collected over 60 years

1928 births
Living people
Sportspeople from Chemnitz
German female single skaters
German figure skating coaches
Female sports coaches
Recipients of the Order of Merit of the Free State of Saxony